The 2017 Tour of the Alps was a road cycling stage race that took place in Austria and Italy between 17 and 21 April 2017. It was the 41st edition of the renamed Giro del Trentino and was rated as a 2.HC event as part of the 2017 UCI Europe Tour.

 and one of its riders won the overall classification for the third year in succession, as Geraint Thomas became the first British rider to win the race. Thomas won the third stage of the race, taking the leader's fuchsia jersey as a result, and ultimately won by seven seconds ahead of Thibaut Pinot, who finished all five stages within the top-five, including a stage win on the final day. The podium was completed by 's Domenico Pozzovivo, a further thirteen seconds in arrears of Pinot.

This was the last race of Michele Scarponi, who died the following day while training near home.

Route
In October 2016, it was announced that the race would expand from four to five days. The route for the race was announced on 17 February 2017.

Teams
On 17 February 2017, the race's eighteen competing teams were announced at the Biathlon World Championships 2017 in Hochfilzen, Austria. These included seven UCI WorldTeams, seven UCI Professional Continental teams, three UCI Continental teams and an Italian national team.

Stages

Stage 1
17 April 2017 — Kufstein (Austria) to Innsbruck-Hungerburg (Austria),

Stage 2
18 April 2017 — Vipiteno (Italy) to Innervillgraten (Austria),

Stage 3
19 April 2017 — Niederdorf (Italy) to Villnöß (Italy),

Stage 4
20 April 2017 — Bolzano (Italy) to Cles (Italy),

Stage 5
21 April 2017 — Smarano (Italy) to Trento (Italy),

Classification leadership table
In the 2017 Tour of the Alps, four different jerseys were awarded. The general classification was calculated by adding each cyclist's finishing times on each stage. Time bonuses were awarded to the first three finishers on all stages: the stage winner won a ten-second bonus, with six and four seconds for the second and third riders respectively. The leader of the general classification received a fuchsia jersey; this classification was considered the most important of the 2017 Tour of the Alps, and the winner of the classification was considered the winner of the race.

The second classification was the sprints classification, the leader of which was awarded a red jersey. In the sprints classification, riders received points for finishing in the top three at intermediate sprint points during each stage. Points were awarded on a 6–4–2 scale for the first four stages, while the points were doubled for the final stage.

There was also a mountains classification, for which points were awarded for reaching the top of a climb before other riders. Each of the ten climbs were categorised as either first, second, or third-category, with more points available for the more difficult, higher-categorised climbs. For first-category climbs, the top five riders earned points; on the other climbs, only the top three riders earned points. The leadership of the mountains classification was marked by a green jersey.

The fourth jersey represented the young rider classification, marked by a white jersey. Only riders born after 1 January 1994 were eligible; the young rider best placed in the general classification was the leader of the young rider classification. There was also a classification for teams, in which the times of the best three cyclists in a team on each stage were added together; the leading team at the end of the race was the team with the lowest cumulative time.

Notes

References

External links
 

2017
2017 UCI Europe Tour
2017 in Italian sport
2017 in Austrian sport
April 2017 sports events in Europe